The 2001 Zimbabwe Coca-Cola Cup was a One Day International (ODI) cricket tournament held in Zimbabwe in late June 2001. It was a tri-nation series between the national representative cricket teams of the Zimbabwe, India and West Indies. West Indies won the tournament by defeating India by 16 runs in the final.

Squads

Andy Flower was ruled out of the tournament with a dislocated thumb bone and was replaced with Tatenda Taibu for Zimbabwe. India's Ashish Nehra, who was to return to India following the Test series, was retained for the series.

Fixtures

1st ODI

2nd ODI

3rd ODI

4th ODI

5th ODI

6th ODI

Final

References

External links
 Series home at ESPN Cricinfo

International cricket competitions in 2001
Indian cricket tours of Zimbabwe
West Indian cricket tours of Zimbabwe
2001 in Zimbabwean cricket
One Day International cricket competitions
Coca-Cola